The 2022 European Archery Championships were held from 6 to 12 June in Munich, Germany.

Championships also served as qualification event for 2023 European Games.

Medal table

Medal summary

Recurve

Compound

Participating countries 
A total of 296 competitors and 103 officials from the national teams of the following 40 countries were registered to compete at 2022 European Championships.

  (8)
  (4)
  (6)
  (4)
  (5)
  (1)
  (10)
  (12)
  (11)
  (3)
  (10)
  (12)
  (6)
  (12)
  (12)
  (6)
  (2)
  (12)
  (4)
  (5)
  (12)
  (3)
  (6)
  (9)
  (6)
  (4)
  (12)
  (4)
  (12)
  (9)
  (2)
  (1)
  (6)
  (10)
  (9)
  (8)
  (6)
  (10)
  (12)
  (10)

Belarusian and Russian archers were not allowed to compete at the event after a ban as a result of the Russian invasion of Ukraine.

References

External links
 Results Book

 
European Archery Championships
2022 in archery
2022 in German sport
European Archery Championships
2022 in European sport